The 2016–17 season is Blackburn Rovers' 129th season as a professional football club and its fifth playing in the Championship. Along with competing in the Championship, the club will also participate in the FA Cup and League Cup. The season covers the period from 1 July 2016 to 30 June 2017. Rovers were relegated to League One on 7 May 2017, in spite of their 3–1 away win against Brentford, with results elsewhere going against them.

Summer Activity

May

On 12 May Rovers announced a five-year deal with kit supplier Umbro.

On 20 May Rovers announced their retained list, Tommy Spurr, Matthew Kilgallon, Chris Taylor, Chris Brown, Lee Williamson, Nathan Delfouneso, Simon Eastwood and Simeon Jackson would all be free to talk to and sign for other clubs upon the expiry of their contracts on 30 June. However, several players have been informed that final decisions over their futures will be made once a new manager has been appointed. Those under 24, Jack Doyle and Connor Thomson have agreed 1 year deals, scholars Josh Askew, Ramirez Howarth and Lewis Travis have also agreed to sign professional terms. Stuart Callaway, David Carson, Modou Cham, Ryan Crump, Anton Forrester, Devarn Green, Sam Joel, Sam Lavelle, Jan Pirretas, Jordan Preston, Hyuga Tanner and Luke Wall have been released.

June

On 1 June Rovers announced that Owen Coyle has been appointed as new manager on a 2-year deal.

On 17 June Rovers announced the signing of Anthony Stokes on a 3-year deal, following his release from Celtic.

On 18 June it was confirmed that Goalkeeping Coach Laurence Batty had left the club and that new Rovers manager Owen Coyle was in the process of firming up a new coach who would be in place before the players started training.

On 21 June Rovers announced the signing of Stephen Hendrie on a season-long loan from West Ham United.

On 23 June Rovers announced the signing of Danny Graham on a 2-year deal, following his release from Sunderland.

On 23 June Oxford United announced the signing of Simon Eastwood following his contract expiry.

On 25 June Rovers announced the signing of Liam Feeney on a 2-year deal, following his release from Bolton Wanderers.

On 27 June Preston North End announced the signing of Tommy Spurr, who was offered a new contract by Rovers, on a 3-year deal following his contract expiry.

On 29 June Rovers announced that Alan Irvine has mutually agreed to leave the club with immediate effect.

On 29 June Rovers announced the signing of Jack Byrne on a season-long loan from Manchester City.

July

On 1 July Bolton Wanderers announced the signing of  Chris Taylor following his contract expiry.

On 4 July Rovers announced Sandy Stewart as assistant manager.

On 12 July Port Vale announced signing of Anton Forrester on a 2-year deal, following his release.

On 18 July Walsall announced signing of Simeon Jackson on a 2-year deal, following his release.

On 21 July Rovers announced the sale of Grant Hanley to Newcastle United for an undisclosed fee.

On 25 July Burton Albion announced signing of Lee Williamson on a 1-year deal, following his release.

August

On 1 August Bradford City announced signing of Matthew Kilgallon on a 1-year deal, following his release.

On 2 August Rovers announced the signing of Gordon Greer on a 1-year deal, following his release from Brighton & Hove Albion.

On 3 August Rovers announced that Rob Kelly has mutually agreed to leave the club with immediate effect.

On 5 August Rovers announced the appointment of John Henry as first team coach.

On 5 August Bury announced signing of Chris Brown on a 1-year deal, following his release.

On 8 August Rovers announced John O'Sullivan has joined Accrington Stanley on loan until 7 January.

On 11 August Rovers announced the signing of Sam Gallagher on a season long loan from Southampton.

On 25 August Rovers announced the signing of Martin Samuelsen on a season long loan from West Ham United.

On 26 August Rovers announced Shane Duffy has joined Brighton & Hove Albion for an undisclosed fee.

On 26 August Rovers announced the double signing of Tommie Hoban on a season long loan from Watford and Derrick William on a 3-year deal from Bristol City.

On 29 August Rovers announced squad numbers for the development squad for the EFL Trophy.

On 31 August Rovers announced the signing of Charlie Mulgrew on a 3-year deal following his release Celtic.

On 31 August Rovers announced the signing of Marvin Emnes on loan  from Swansea City until 17 January 2017.

September

On 21 September Rovers announced the signing of Wes Brown on a free transfer following his release from Sunderland in the summer, he will also help coach the u23s team.

November

On 22 November Rovers announced Martin Samuelsen has returned to West Ham United with immediate effect.

December

On 5 December Rovers were drawn away against QPR in the third-round of the FA Cup.

Winter Activity

January

On 5 January Rovers announced the appointment of Paul Senior as Football Director.

On 6 January Rovers announced Jack Byrne has returned to Manchester City with immediate effect.

On 9 January Blackburn were drawn at home against either Barnsley/Blackpool in the 4th round of the FA Cup .

On 9 January Rovers announced promising youngsters Jack Doyle & Connor Thomson have signed new deals till 2019.

On 17 January Rovers announced John O'Sullivan has left the club by mutual consent.

On 20 January Rovers announced Scott Wharton has joined Cambridge United on loan until the end of the season.

On 24 January Rovers announced Josh Askew has joined Warrington Town on loan.

On 27 January Rovers announced promising young midfielder Joe Rankin-Costello has signed his first professional deal till 2019.

On 30 January Rovers announced Lucas João has joined on loan from Sheffield Wednesday until the end of the season.

On 31 January Rovers announced Marvin Emnes has rejoined on loan from Swansea City until the end of the season.

On 31 January Rovers announced Ben Marshall has left the club to join Wolverhampton Wanderers for an undisclosed fee.

February

On 11 February Rovers announced Ramirez Howarth has joined Skelmersdale United on loan.

On 15 February Rovers announced Matthew Platt and Connor Thompson have joined Barrow on loan.

On 21 February Rovers announced that manager Owen Coyle has left the club by mutual consent, assistant manager Sandy Stewart, first team coach John Henry and goalkeeping coach Phil Hughes have also left the club.

On 22 February Rovers announced the appointment of Tony Mowbray as the club's new head coach, with Head of Academy coach David Lowe stepping up to become Assistant Manager and David Dunn stepping up to become 1st Team Coach.

March

On 2 March Rovers announced goalkeeper David Raya has signed a new deal till 2019.

Squad information

Pre-Season Friendlies
On 23 May 2016, Blackburn Rovers announced five pre-season friendlies, with a sixth friendly expected to be confirmed at a later date. The games are during, and follow a six-day training camp in Austria from July 4–10 which included a friendly against Austrian Bundesliga side SV Ried.

Upon returning to England following the training camp, Rovers had three hour long friendlies in the shape of a tournament against Morecambe and Bury at Morecambe's Globe Arena. The following week Rovers will travel to Rochdale for a friendly at Spotland Stadium and Blackpool four days later at Bloomfield Road.

Rovers only friendly at Ewood Park was finally announced on 22 June against second tier Spanish team Girona.

Championship Season

League table

Result by round

Matches

EFL Cup

The first round draw of EFL Cup took place on Wednesday 22 June, Rovers were drawn away to League Two side Mansfield Town.

FA Cup

The first round draw of FA Cup took place on 12 December, Rovers were drawn away to Championship side Queens Park Rangers F.C.

EFL Trophy

Blackburn Development Squad entered the competition at the first round group stage and were drawn against Carlisle United, Fleetwood Town and Oldham Athletic in Northern Group D.

Backroom Staff

Squad statistics

Appearances and Goals

  

  

 
 

|-
|colspan="14"|Players out on loan:   
 
|-
|colspan="14"|Players that played for Blackburn Rovers this season that have left the club:  

 
|}

Goalscorers

Disciplinary record

Transfers and loans

Summer

Transfers in

Total outgoing:  ~£250,000

Loans in

Transfers out

Total incoming:  ~£10,467,500-£10,917,500

Subtracts estimated 10% sell on fee (£550,000-£600,000) due to Crewe in Grant Hanley's £5,500,000-£6,000,000 sale to Newcastle United.
Includes estimated 15% sell on fee (£1,250,000) following Ruben Rochina's transfer from Granada to Rubin Kazan on 20 July 2016 for €10,000,000.
Includes estimated 25% sell on fee (~£67,500) following Jack O'Connell's transfer from Brentford to Sheffield United on 10 July 2016 (assumed here to be £250,000, though the fee was undisclosed).

Loans out

Winter

Transfers in

Total outgoing: ~£0 £0+/-

Loans in

Transfers out

Total incoming:  ~£1,650,000

Includes estimated 15% profit sell on fee (£150,000) following Martin Olsson's transfer from Norwich City to Swansea City on 17 January 2017 for an undisclosed fee that is estimated to be £4,000,000, having originally been sold to Norwich City for £3,000,000.

Loans out

References

Blackburn Rovers
Blackburn Rovers F.C. seasons